The 860th Bombardment Squadron is a former United States Army Air Forces unit that was assigned to the 493d Bombardment Group during World War II.  It was part of the last bombardment group to be assigned to Eighth Air Force.  It flew combat missions until V-E Day, then returned to the United States for inactivation.  In 1985, the squadron was consolidated with the 660th Bombardment Squadron, a Strategic Air Command unit that flew Boeing B-47 Stratojets during the Cold War.  Although the two squadrons were consolidated as the 967th Airborne Warning and Control Squadron, they have never been active under that designation.

History

World War II

Initial activation and training in the United States
The 860th Bombardment Squadron was first activated in September 1943 at McCook Army Air Field, Nebraska as one of the original four squadrons of the 493d Bombardment Group. The formation of the squadron was delayed by an administrative error that caused some of the unit's cadre to report to Davis-Monthan Field, Arizona instead of McCook. It was not until January 1944 that all personnel were at McCook. By this time, the squadron had transferred on paper to Elveden Hall, England. The ground personnel of the squadron in the United States had been used to form Boeing B-29 Superfortress units being activated by Second Air Force, while the air echelon remained in Nebraska to conduct training on their assigned Consolidated B-24 Liberators. Meanwhile, Eighth Air Force formed a new ground echelon for the squadron in England from other units assigned to the 3d Bombardment Division. This ground echelon moved to the squadron's combat station, RAF Debach, in April 1944.

Combat in Europe

The squadron flew its first combat mission on D-Day, 6 June 1944.  It continued to fly Liberators until 24 August 1944, when it was withdrawn from combat to convert to Boeing B-17 Flying Fortresses, along with other units of the 93d Bombardment Wing, as Eighth Air Force concentrated all its Liberators in the 2d Bombardment Division.  It resumed combat missions with the B-17 on 8 September 1944. The squadron concentrated its attacks on military and industrial targets in Germany, attacking an ordnance depot in Magdeburg, factories near Frankfurt, and a synthetic oil manufacturing plant at Merseburg.  It also attacked lines of communications, including a railroad tunnel at Ahrweiler, bridges at Irlich, and marshalling yards near Cologne.

The squadron was occasionally diverted from the strategic bombing campaign to attack tactical targets.  It supported Operation Overlord, the Normandy invasion, striking artillery batteries, airfields and bridges.  It struck enemy ground forces south of Caen and during Operation Cobra, the breakout at St Lo.  It bombed German fortifications to support Operation Market Garden, airborne attacks attempting to secure a bridgehead across the Rhine in the Netherlands, and attacked communications during the Battle of the Bulge.  Toward the end of the war, it also supported Operation Varsity, the airborne assault across the Rhine in Germany.

The squadron flew its last combat mission against marshalling yards near Nauen on 20 April 1945, although it flew food-dropping missions in early May. In late August, the squadron assembled at Sioux Falls Army Air Field, South Dakota, where it was inactivated on 28 August 1945.

Strategic Air Command

Starting in 1958, the Boeing B-47 Stratojet wings of Strategic Air Command (SAC) began to assume an alert posture at their home bases, reducing the amount of time spent on alert at overseas bases.  The SAC alert cycle divided itself into four parts: planning, flying, alert and rest to meet General Thomas S. Power's initial goal of maintaining one third of SAC's planes on fifteen minute ground alert, fully fueled and ready for combat to reduce vulnerability to a Soviet missile strike. To implement this new system, B-47 wings reorganized from three to four squadrons. The 660th Bombardment Squadron was activated at Forbes Air Force Base, Kansas as the fourth squadron of the 40th Bombardment Wing. The SAC alert commitment was increased to half the wing's aircraft in 1962 and the four squadron pattern no longer met the alert cycle commitment, so the squadron was inactivated on 1 January 1962.

Consolidation
In September 1985, the 860th Bombardment Squadron and the 660th Bombardment Squadron were consolidated as the 967th Airborne Warning and Control Squadron.

Lineage
 860th Bombardment Squadron
 Constituted as the 860th Bombardment Squadron (Heavy) on 14 September 1943
 Activated on 1 November 1943
 Redesignated 860 Bombardment Squadron, Heavy on 21 February 1944
 Inactivated on 28 August 1945
 Consolidated with the 660th Bombardment Squadron as the 967th Airborne Warning and Control Squadron on 19 September 1985

 967th Airborne Warning and Control Squadron
 Constituted in 1958 as the 660th Bombardment Squadron, Medium
 Activated on 1 February 1959
 Inactivated on 1 January 1962
 Consolidated with the 860th Bombardment Squadron as the 967th Airborne Warning and Control Squadron on 15 September 1985

Assignments
 493d Bombardment Group, 1 November 1943 – 28 August 1945
 40th Bombardment Wing, 1 February 1959 – 1 January 1962

Stations
 McCook Army Air Field, Nebraska, 1 November 1943 – 1 January 1944
 Elveden Hall, England (Station 116), England, 1 January 1944
 RAF Debach (Station 152), England, 17 April 1944 – 6 August 1945
 Sioux Falls Army Air Field, South Dakota, c. 13–28 August 1945
 Forbes Air Force Base, Kansas, 1 February 1959 - 1 January 1962

Aircraft
 Consolidated B-24 Liberator, 1943–1944
 Boeing B-17 Flying Fortress, 1944-1945
 Boeing B-47 Stratojet, 1959-1962

Campaigns

See also

 B-17 Flying Fortress units of the United States Army Air Forces
 B-24 Liberator units of the United States Army Air Forces
 List of B-47 units of the United States Air Force

References

Notes

Bibliography

 
 
 
 
 
 

\

Strategic bombing squadrons of the United States Army Air Forces
Military units and formations established in 1943